Damnesia is an album by the punk rock band Alkaline Trio, released July 12, 2011 through their label Heart & Skull, a joint venture with Epitaph Records. A primarily acoustic album, it consists of "a selection of beloved fan favorites selected from the group's extensive catalogue and presented in an intimate semi-unplugged format". The album also includes two new songs, "Olde English 800" and "I Remember a Rooftop", as well as a cover version of the Violent Femmes' "I Held Her in My Arms". A music video consisting of studio footage was released for the song "Clavicle", and the band has embarked a fifteenth-anniversary United States tour in support of the album.

Reception

Damnesia was released to mostly positive reviews. AbsolutePunk gave it a rating of 7.5/10, stating that "Damnesia satiates the appetite fans have for new material, while proving that an old band can still do new tricks.". Big Cheese gave it a rating of 8/10, stating that the album took a "mellower approach" than the band's previous effort. However, Allmusic gave it 3/5, whilst Blare Magazine also gave it the same score, saying that "there’s the odd inclusion where those old breakup lyrics, slowed down to unplugged-tempo, don’t have the same ring".

Track listing

Personnel 
Matt Skiba – guitar, vocals
Dan Andriano – bass, vocals
Derek Grant – drums, vocals

References

External links

Damnesia at YouTube (streamed copy where licensed)

Alkaline Trio albums
2011 compilation albums
Epitaph Records albums